The 1903 Michigan Agricultural Aggies football team represented Michigan Agricultural College (MAC) in the 1903 college football season. In their first year under head coach Chester Brewer, the Aggies compiled a 6–1–1 record and outscored their opponents 178 to 24.

Schedule

References

Michigan Agricultural
Michigan State Spartans football seasons
Michigan Agricultural Aggies football